Rafinesquina is an extinct genus of large brachiopod that existed from the Darriwilian to the Ludlow epoch. 

The genus was named in honor of polymath Constantine Samuel Rafinesque.

Description
Rafinesquina's members were epifaunal, meaning they lived on top of the seafloor, not buried within it, and were suspension feeders. Rafinesquina normally have a concavo-convex profile, with radiating striae of alternating size which are crossed with finer concentric striae. Their width is usually greater than their length, like most Strophomenids. Members of this genus had shells that grew in increments, with each increment forming a layer of the shell (much like trees do with their rings). In 1982, Gary D. Rosenberg analyzed specimens of Rafinesquina alternata previously inferred to have lived in a shallow subtidal environment and proposed it could be possible to estimate the total number of days in a lunar month (the period between full moons) during the Late Ordovician using layer counting.

Distribution
Rafinesquina specimens had a cosmopolitan distribution, and their fossils can be found in the Americas, Europe, and Asia.

Species
Species in the genus Rafinesquina include:

R. alternata (Conrad, 1838)
R. declivis (James, 1874)
R. delicata Williams, 1974
R. deltoidea (Conrad, 1838)
R. insidiosa Williams, 1962
R. jeffersonensis Bradley, 1930
R. latisculptilus (Savage, 1913)
R. lignani Vilas, 1985 
R. mesicosta Shumard, 1860
R. mucronata Foerste, 1914
R. nasuta (Emmons, 1842)
R. oanduensis Oraspold, 1956
R. orvikui Oraspold, 1956
R. percensis Cooper and Kindle, 1936
R. planulata Cooper, 1956
R. ponderosa Hayes and Ulrich, 1903
R. pseudoloricata (Barrande, 1848)
R. relicula Benedetto, 1995
R. stropheodontoides (Savage, 1913)
R. trentonensis (Hall, 1847)
R. ultrix Marek and Havlíček, 1967
R. urbicola Marek and Havlíček, 1967

References

Prehistoric brachiopod genera
Ordovician brachiopods
Silurian brachiopods
Paleozoic animals of Asia
Paleozoic animals of Europe
Paleozoic animals of North America
Paleozoic animals of South America
Paleozoic brachiopods of Asia
Paleozoic brachiopods of Europe
Paleozoic brachiopods of North America
Paleozoic brachiopods of South America
Fossils of Argentina
Fossils of Belarus
Fossils of Bolivia
Fossils of Canada
Paleozoic life of British Columbia
Paleozoic life of Manitoba
Paleozoic life of Newfoundland and Labrador
Paleozoic life of the Northwest Territories
Paleozoic life of Nunavut
Paleozoic life of Ontario
Verulam Formation
Paleozoic life of Quebec
Fossils of China
Fossils of the Czech Republic
Letná Formation
Fossils of Estonia
Fossils of France
Fossils of Latvia
Fossils of Lithuania
Fossils of North Korea
Fossils of Norway
Fossils of Portugal
Fossils of Russia
Fossils of South Korea
Fossils of Spain
Fossils of Great Britain
Fossils of the United States
Fossils of Georgia (U.S. state)
Fossils of Venezuela
Fossil taxa described in 1892